Mackworth is a civil parish in the Amber Valley district of Derbyshire, England.  The parish contains 14 listed buildings that are recorded in the National Heritage List for England.  Of these, two are listed at Grade I, the highest of the three grades, and the others are at Grade II, the lowest grade.  The parish consists of the village of Mackworth and the surrounding area,  The listed buildings consist of a church with associated structures, a ruined gatehouse, houses, cottages and farmhouses, a boundary post and a milepost, and a school.


Key

Buildings

References

Citations

Sources

 

Lists of listed buildings in Derbyshire